Best Reason to Buy the Sun is a 2005 (see 2005 in music) album from the Benevento-Russo Duo.  Made up of only Joe Russo and Marco Benevento, playing only Keyboards and Drums, the Duo's debut studio recording is remenisent of Medeski, Martin & Wood or late Phish, to such a degree that Mike Gordon, of Phish, toured with the Duo following the release of the album.  This album builds on the live work that the Duo has been doing since the release in 2003 of Darts, a live album from the Knitting Factory.

Track listing
"Becky" - 4:35
"Welcome Red" - 5:20
"Sunny's Song" - 4:18
"Vortex" - 5:01
"9X9" - 6:05
"Scratchitti" (featuring- Skerikon tenor saxophone & Mike Dillon on vibraphone and timbales - 5:34
"Three Question Marks" - 7:28
"Bronko's Blues" - 6:20
"My Pet Goat" - 15:09

2005 albums
Benevento/Russo Duo albums